KHRI may refer to:

 KHRI (FM), a radio station (90.7 FM) licensed to Hollister, California, United States
 Kresge Hearing Research Institute, an Otolaryngology school at the University of Michigan at Ann Arbor, Michigan, United States
 the ICAO code for Hermiston Municipal Airport, in Hermiston, Oregon, United States